Khamnigaday is a rural locality (a selo) in Kyakhtinsky District, Republic of Buryatia, Russia. The population was 92 as of 2010. There are 2 streets.

Geography 
Khamnigaday is located 94 km southeast of Kyakhta (the district's administrative centre) by road. Kudara-Somon is the nearest rural locality.

References 

Rural localities in Kyakhtinsky District